Kakumia ferruginea is a butterfly in the family Lycaenidae. It is found in southern Cameroon and the Republic of the Congo.

References

Butterflies described in 1923
Poritiinae